FK REO Vilnius was a Lithuanian football team, based in the town of Vilnius. The club participated in the 2012 A Lyga, the top flight of Lithuanian football, but dissolved half-way through the season due to unpaid debts, pulling out of the league in August 2012.

History 
FK REO was initially founded in 2005 and dissolved in 2012.

The team reached the semi-finals of the 2011–12 Lithuanian Football Cup.

References 

Defunct football clubs in Lithuania
2012 disestablishments in Lithuania
Association football clubs disestablished in 2012
Association football clubs established in 2005
2005 establishments in Lithuania